Fredy Williams Thompson León (born June 2, 1982 in Puerto Barrios, Izabal) is a Guatemalan former professional footballer.

Club career
Thompson started his career at Guatemalan giants Comunicaciones where he would stay for 7 years and captain the side. He then joined bitter rivals Municipal in 2007, but he was never accepted by the Rojos 'fans so he decided not to return after only one season.
A move to Europe with Inter Milan or Manchester United, or American Major League Soccer had been mentioned for some time, but he joined Mexican side Albinegros in 2008, only to return to the Cremas in June 2008.

Thompson signed for Universidad SC in January 2019.

Doping case and suspension
In February 2012, Thompson, alongside Comunicaciones teammates Adolfo Machado and Marvin Ceballos, was temporarily suspended from playing by FIFA after a positive test on the banned substance boldenone. A second test done at a laboratory in Canada reconfirmed the positive doping test and he was later suspended for two years, until 24 January 2014.

International career
He made his debut for the Guatemalan national team in a March 2001 friendly match against Trinidad & Tobago and went on to represent Guatemala during the 2006 World Cup qualification and 2010 World Cup qualification rounds. As of January 2010, he had earned 81 caps, scoring no goals.

He has also captained the national side in the absence of Carlos Ruiz.

On September 7, 2010 he scored his second international goal in a 2–0 win against El Salvador.

On November 15, 2011 in a 2014 World Cup qualification match against Grenada, he scored his third goal to give Guatemala a 2–1 lead. The match ended 4–1.

References

External links
 

1982 births
Living people
People from Puerto Barrios
Guatemalan expatriate footballers
Association football midfielders
Guatemalan footballers
Guatemala international footballers
Comunicaciones F.C. players
C.S.D. Municipal players
Expatriate footballers in Mexico
2001 UNCAF Nations Cup players
2002 CONCACAF Gold Cup players
2003 UNCAF Nations Cup players
2003 CONCACAF Gold Cup players
2005 CONCACAF Gold Cup players
2007 UNCAF Nations Cup players
Copa Centroamericana-winning players
Doping cases in association football
Antigua GFC players